Eric Arthur Berntson (May 16, 1941 – September 23, 2018) was a Canadian politician.

Saskatchewan politics
Berntson was first elected to the Legislative Assembly of Saskatchewan as a member of the Progressive Conservatives for the district of Souris-Cannington in the 1975 Saskatchewan general election. He served as Leader of the Opposition from 1979 to 1982 as newly elected party leader Grant Devine did not have a seat in the legislature.

He served in the Saskatchewan legislature until 1990 and was Deputy Premier in the Devine government. Berntson was widely regarded to be one of the most powerful members of the Devine government, arguably exercising more influence than the premier himself.

In 1999, Berntson was convicted of illegally diverting government allowances between 1987 and 1991 when he was Saskatchewan's deputy premier. He was sentenced to one year in prison.

Canadian Senate
Berntson was appointed on the advice of Brian Mulroney to the Senate of Canada on September 27, 1990 as part of the never before used expansion clause that allows two extra members per regional division after the Senate all the normal Senate seats are occupied.

He served as Deputy Leader of the Opposition in the Senate from 1994 to 1997 when he was charged with fraud.

Berntson resigned from the Senate on February 27, 2001 after the Supreme Court of Canada dismissed his attempt to overturn his fraud conviction.

Berntson also appeared on the 1991 tape that showed current Conservative MP Tom Lukiwski making homophobic slurs and future Saskatchewan premier Brad Wall mocking Roy Romanow in a Ukrainian accent which was revealed to the public on March 31, 2008.

Berntson died in Ottawa on September 23, 2018.

References

External links
 
 Obituary in the Calgary Herald

1941 births
2018 deaths
Progressive Conservative Party of Saskatchewan MLAs
Progressive Conservative Party of Canada senators
Canadian senators from Saskatchewan
Canadian politicians convicted of fraud
21st-century Canadian politicians
Deputy premiers of Saskatchewan
Corruption in Canada